The Blue-Eyed Giant (Turkish title: Mavi Gözlü Dev) is a 2007 biographical film about the period when poet Nazim Hikmet spent in Bursa Prison after 1941.  The film was directed by Biket Ilhan, who played the famous poet Yetkin Dikinciler. The filming of the film, which received 175.000 TL support from the Ministry of Culture and Tourism, took place on the set of the prison established by the art director Mustafa Zia Ülkenciler in Beykoz. The script of the film, which went down in the history of world cinema as the first film about the life of Nazim Hikmet, was rewritten and completed eight times in a period of more than four years. Cem Idiz, who composed the music for the film, also composed Hikmet's poem "Invitation", and this composition was interpreted by Onur Şentürk. The title of the film was compiled from the poem "Blue-Eyed Giant, Tiny Woman and Honeysuckles" by Nazim Hikmet. 

With 228,295 box office admissions, it is the fifth most attended film by a female director in Turkey from 2004 to 2013.

Cast

References

External links 

 
 Nazım Hikmet's "Invitation" poem 
 Film's Trailer

2007 films
Turkish drama films